Ornithobacterium rhinotracheale, or ORT, is a bacterium that causes respiratory disease in poultry. It can cause disease in birds of all ages and is potentially fatal.  O. rhinotracheale is found worldwide, and the bacterium may be spread between birds either horizontally or vertically. It is not a zoonosis.

Clinical Signs
Most commonly, respiratory signs are seen. These include nasal discharge, dyspnoea, sneezing and coughing. A drop in growth rates and abnormal egg production and joint problems may also be seen. There are reports of gastrointestinal and neurological symptoms in some cases.

Clinical signs are generally worse in meat producing birds.

Diagnosis

The disease caused by ORT is characterized by pneumonia, pleuritis and air sacculitis on postmortem examination. However diagnosis should be confirmed using laboratory tests such as bacterial culture, PCR, agar gel precipitation, ELISA and serum agglutination.

Treatment & Control
Antibiotic treatment can be attempted, but is not always successful. The choice of antibiotic should be based on culture and sensitivity results.

Vaccination is reported to reduce the incidence of disease.

References

Ornithobacterium rhinotracheale: An Update Review
about An Emerging Poultry Pathogen -
Barbosa et.al., Vet.Sci.2020, 7, 3; doi:10.3390/vetsci7010003 -
www.mdpi.com/journal/vetsci

External links
Ornithobacterium rhinotracheale, Wikivet
Type strain of Ornithobacterium rhinotracheale at BacDive -  the Bacterial Diversity Metadatabase

Poultry diseases
Bacterial diseases
Bacteria described in 1994